Øravíkarlíð (alternative spelling Ørðavíkarlíð) or Líðin is a village on the island of Suðuroy, the southernmost of the Faroe Islands. The population was 60 in December 2008.

See also
 List of towns in the Faroe Islands

References 

Populated places in the Faroe Islands